Jo-Anna Downey (February 1, 1967—December 2016) was a multiple Canadian Comedy Award-nominated stand-up comedian.

She was the host of two popular weekly Toronto, Ontario comedy shows, Open Mike at Spirits (since 1996) and Standing on the Danforth.

Downey suffered from amyotrophic lateral sclerosis since 2012 and ended her career by 2013. Downey died on December 1, 2016.

References

External links

1967 births
2016 deaths
Canadian stand-up comedians
Canadian women comedians
Neurological disease deaths in Ontario
Deaths from motor neuron disease
20th-century Canadian comedians
21st-century Canadian comedians
20th-century Canadian women
Canadian Comedy Award winners